The 2007 Big East Men's Basketball Championship was played from March 7 to March 10, 2007.  The tournament took place at Madison Square Garden in New York City and was sponsored by Aéropostale.  The Georgetown Hoyas won the tournament for the first time since 1989 and the seventh time overall, and were awarded an automatic bid to the 2007 NCAA men's basketball tournament. Jeff Green of Georgetown was given the Dave Gavitt Trophy, awarded to the tournament's most outstanding player.

Bracket

Only the teams with the 12 best records during the regular season qualified for the tournament. The thirteenth through sixteenth finishers (Seton Hall, South Florida, Rutgers, and Cincinnati) did not take part.

Games
1st round:  Wednesday, March 7

Noon

2PM

7PM

9PM

Quarterfinals:  Thursday, March 8

Noon

2 PM

7 PM

9 PM

Semifinals:  Friday, March 9

7 PM

9 PM

Finals:  Saturday, March 10
9 PM

Championship game

On March 10, Georgetown defeated Pittsburgh, 65–42. The Panthers shot just 26.2 percent from the field in the loss. After Pittsburgh cut the lead to 13–11 with 9:04 remaining, Georgetown went on a huge run and led 28–13 with 2:58 left. The game was not close again. Jeff Green led all scorers with 21 points, while Roy Hibbert had 18. Hibbert also added eleven rebounds.

Georgetown and Pittsburgh had previously split their two regular season meetings, each winning at home. It was the Hoyas first conference tournament title since 1989 when Alonzo Mourning and Charles Smith led the way. Pittsburgh was in the championship game for the sixth time in seven years, but set a record for fewest points in a Big East final. Sam Young led the team with a meager 10 points. Pittsburgh's Aaron Gray had a season-low 3 points, going 1-of-13 from the floor.

Awards
Dave Gavitt Trophy (Most Outstanding Player): Jeff Green, Georgetown

All-Tournament Team
Roy Hibbert, Georgetown
DaJuan Summers, Georgetown
Terrence Williams, Louisville
Russel Carter, Notre Dame
Antonio Graves, Pittsburgh

References

Tournament
Big East men's basketball tournament
Basketball in New York City
College sports in New York City
Sports competitions in New York City
Sports in Manhattan
Big East men's basketball tournament
Big East men's basketball tournament
2000s in Manhattan
Madison Square Garden